New Zealand has over 2,500 primary and secondary schools.

State schools and state integrated schools are primarily funded by the central government. Private schools receive a lower level of state funding (about 25% of their costs). See Secondary education in New Zealand for more details.

Population decline in rural and some urban areas has led to school closures in recent decades. This was a much debated topic in 2003–2004.

Schools by region

North Island
List of schools in the Auckland Region
List of schools in the Bay of Plenty Region
List of schools in the Gisborne Region
List of schools in the Hawke's Bay Region
List of schools in the Manawatu-Wanganui Region
List of schools in the Northland Region
List of schools in the Taranaki Region
List of schools in the Waikato Region
List of schools in the Wellington Region

South Island and other islands
List of schools in the Canterbury Region
List of schools in Christchurch
List of schools in the Chatham Islands
List of schools in the Marlborough Region
List of schools in Nelson, New Zealand
List of schools in the Otago Region
List of schools in the Southland Region
List of schools in the Tasman Region
List of schools in the West Coast Region

Schools by type
List of Catholic schools in New Zealand

Former schools
Closed schools in the Northland Region

See also 
Education in New Zealand
Secondary education in New Zealand
The Correspondence School
One Day School
List of Catholic schools in New Zealand

References